Caryota is a genus of palm trees. They are often known as fishtail palms because of the shape of their leaves. There are about 13 species native to Asia (China, India, Indonesia, etc.), northern Australia, and the South Pacific. One of the more widely known species is Caryota urens, the flowers of which are used to make one type of jaggery (an unrefined sugar), and also to make palm wine. Caryota mitis is native to Indochina, but has become an invasive introduced species in the US state of Florida. They are also one of the few Arecaceae with bipinnate foliage. Many grow in mountainous areas and are adapted to warm mediterranean climates as well as subtropical and tropical climates.

Fishtail palms contain raphides.

Species

Gallery

References

External links

USDA Plants Profile
GRIN Species list
Palm Guide

 
Arecaceae genera
Flora of Indomalesia
Garden plants of Asia
Garden plants of Oceania
Taxa named by Carl Linnaeus